The 2020–21 Metro Atlantic Athletic Conference (MAAC) men's basketball season began with practices in October 2020, followed by the start of the 2020–21 NCAA Division I men's basketball season on November 25. Conference play started in December and concluded in March 2021. This season was the 40th season of MAAC basketball.

Due to the ongoing COVID-19 pandemic in the United States, the MAAC revised their scheduling policy for conference games as follows:
 A 20-game double round robin conference schedule with five home series and five away series for each team.
 A Friday/Saturday playing schedule at the same venue for both games, with 24 hours of spacing between the two contests. The men’s and women’s schedules will mirror each other so that the women’s program may be playing a team for a 2-game home series, with the men’s program playing the same opponent on the road - and vice versa in subsequent weeks.
 Make up week retained for the second to last week of the season.
 The use of the same officiating crew for both games of a series, when possible.
 When teams are traveling, only institutional staff and student-athletes that are designated as Tier 1, along with Tier 2 Presidents, Athletic Directors, Senior Woman Administrators and key conference staff members are permitted entrance to a team’s facility.
 Retained a ban on fan attendance at venues through December.
 Approved the threshold for the minimum number of players available for the game to be contested as 8 counter (scholarship) players and at least one coach.

The 2021 MAAC tournament was held from March 8 through March 13 at the Jim Whelan Boardwalk Hall in Atlantic City, New Jersey for the second year in a row. For this season, since it was official that not all MAAC teams would reach the originally scheduled 20 conference game mark, team seeding in the tournament was based on overall conference regular season wins – not including any third games scheduled between teams in lieu of non-conference opponents. A tiebreaker system to seed teams with identical conference records was also used.

Head Coaches

Coaching changes 

On March 13, 2020, Tim Cluess stepped down as head coach of the Iona Gaels due to health concerns. A day later, the school named former Louisville coach Rick Pitino the Gaels' new head coach.

Coaches 

Notes: 
 All records, appearances, titles, etc. are from time with current school only. 
 Year at school includes 2020–21 season.
 Overall and MAAC records are from time at current school and are before the beginning of the 2020–21 season.
 Previous jobs are head coaching jobs unless otherwise noted.

Preseason

Preseason Coaches Poll

( ) first place votes

Preseason All-MAAC teams

† denotes unanimous selection

Preseason Player of the Year

MAAC Regular Season

Conference matrix
This table summarizes the final head-to-head results between teams in conference play.

Player of the week
Throughout the regular season, the Metro Atlantic Athletic Conference offices named player(s) of the week and rookie(s) of the week.

Records against other conferences
Records against non-conference foes for the 2020–21 season. Records shown for regular season only.

Postseason

MAAC Tournament

 2021 Metro Atlantic Athletic Conference Basketball Tournament, Jim Whelan Boardwalk Hall, Atlantic City, New Jersey

* denotes number of overtimes

NCAA Tournament 

 Game summary

Honors and awards

MAAC Awards

† denotes unanimous selection

All-MAAC tournament team

2020–21 Season statistic leaders
Completed for 2020–21 season

Individual statistic NCAA Top 100 leaders
Scoring
Isaiah Ross, Iona (18.4/game): 57th

Rebounding
Manny Camper, Siena (9.7/game): 22nd

Field Goal Percentage (minimum avg 5 made per game)
KC Ndefo, Saint Peter's (127–252 .504): 82nd

Assists per game
Jalen Pickett, Siena (4.8/game): 57th

Blocks per game
KC Ndefo, Saint Peter's (3.64/game): 1st (3rd in total blocks)
Seth Pinkney, Quinnipiac (2.32/game): 22nd
Jordan Jones, Marist (1.90/game): 39th
Nelly Jr. Joseph, Iona (1.61/game): 65th
Warren Williams, Manhattan (1.60/game): 68th

Free Throw Percentage (minimum avg 2.5 made per game)
Asante Gist, Iona (74–83 .891): 16th
Dwight Murray, Jr., Rider (67–78 .859): 49th
Jacob Rigoni, Quinnipiac (65–76 .855): 53rd
Jake Wojcik, Fairfield (76–89 .853): 57th
Taj Benning, Fairfield (74–88 .840): 80th

Steals per game
Berrick JeanLouis, Iona (2.22/game): 18th
Miles Ruth, Monmouth (1.80/game): 66th
Elijah Buchanan, Manhattan (1.74/game): 76th

Three-point percentage (minimum 1.5 made per game)
Isaiah Ross, Iona (46–120 .383): 55th

Team statistic NCAA rankings
of 340 Division I teams

References

External links
MAAC website